The N2 is a Bangladeshi national highway connecting the Bangladeshi capital Dhaka and the town of Tamabil in the Sylhet District. The route passes through the city of Sylhet, crossing the Surma River on the Keane bridge, and sections of the highway are known as the Dhaka–Sylhet Highway and the Sylhet-Tamabil Highway. It is part of AH1 and AH2 in the Asian Highway Network.

This road has been called the deadliest road in the world.

N2 route

References

AH1
National Highways in Bangladesh